Wotje Airport is a public use airstrip located in the village of Wotje on Wotje Atoll, Marshall Islands. This airstrip is assigned the location identifier N36 by the FAA and WTE by the IATA.

Facilities 
Wotje Airport is at an elevation of 4 feet (1.2 m) above mean sea level. The runway is designated 13/31 with a turf surface measuring 4,275 by 75 feet (1,303 x 23 m). There are no aircraft based at Wotje.

Airlines and destinations

References

External links
AirNav airport information for N36
Photo essay: Wotje Airport

Airports in the Marshall Islands
Airport